Hronský Beňadik (1920–1948: ,; ; ,) is a village in central Slovakia. It has a population of 1233 (2005).

According to the local tourist information officer, this is the site referred to in what may be the first written mention of present-day Slovak territory.

This version of events states that in 172 AD Roman Emperor Marcus Aurelius had fought a victorious battle in Hronský Beňadik when it started 'raining fire'. The panic this created in his forces led some of the closet Christians among them to start praying, after which the deluge abated and Marcus Aurelius cut short his campaign. The incident was later recorded in the emperor's own memoirs.

Geography
It is situated in the Hron valley between the mountains Pohronský Inovec and Štiavnické vrchy, located around 40 km east of Nitra and 120 km north-east of Bratislava.

History
The territory of the village has been settled since the Neolithic and Hallstatt period, but it is best known for a very important Benedictine abbey, which played in important role in the Christianization process and in the development of culture and education. It was founded in 1075 by King Géza I under the name "Monasterium Ecclesia Sancti Benedicti". The Nitra Gospels, the oldest Latin book (i.e. not just text) from the territory of Slovakia, were written here around 1100. The abbey ceased operations during the 16th century in the course of the Ottoman expansion in present-day Hungary. The church of the monastery contains valuable works of art (a wood-carving of the Holy Sepulchre, a wall-painting presenting the legend of St. George, an altar depicting the Passion, a sculpture of Jesus Christ from the 13th century, a Madonna sculpture from the 14th century, etc.). The abbey was declared a National Cultural Monument in 1945.

The village below the abbey arose in the 14th century and received a city charter (town privileges) in 1347, but was destroyed by the Turks (Ottomans) in 1599 and later re-built.

Demographics
According to the 2001 census, the village had 1,220 inhabitants. 98.44% of inhabitants were Slovaks, 0.41% Roma, 0.33% Hungarians and 0.25% Czechs. The religious make-up was 91.89% Roman Catholics, 3.28% people with no religious affiliation  and 0.90% Lutherans.

Notable People

Both members of the Slovak pop duo TWiiNS were born on 15 May 1986 in
Hronský Beňadik.

References

External links
https://web.archive.org/web/20070220044905/http://www.sacr.sk/article?id=112&category=18&lang=en
https://web.archive.org/web/20090607180441/http://www.benadik-klastor.sk/
Photos of the Monastery 
Spectacular Slovakia travelguide - Hronský Beňadik: Fire from heaven

Villages and municipalities in Žarnovica District
Burials sites of the House of Koháry